A National Scenic Area in the United States is a federally designated area of outstanding natural and scenic value that receives a level of protection that is less stringent than wilderness designation. Scenic areas are typically occupied or used in some manner by people and either cannot be considered for wilderness designation, or are seen as suitable for a wider range of uses than those permitted under wilderness designation.

The first National Scenic Area in the United States was Mono Basin National Scenic Area in 1984, followed by the much larger and more ambitious Columbia River Gorge National Scenic Area in 1986. The Columbia River Gorge was in a region of outstanding natural beauty that was already heavily used by people. The designation of the Columbia Gorge was controversial, as it imposed a significant amount of federal control on public and private lands that had previously not been significantly regulated. Subsequent scenic area designations have been significantly less far-reaching, typically involving existing federal lands.

List of national scenic areas

Proposed National Scenic Areas
Several proposals have been advanced for additional National Scenic Areas:
 Big Sur Coast National Scenic Area, California, 1980
 Big Schloss National Scenic Area, Virginia and West Virginia, 2009
 Kelley Mountain National Scenic Area, Virginia, 2009
 Shenandoah Mountain National Scenic Area, Virginia, 2009
 Sedona-Red Rocks National Scenic Area, Arizona, legislation introduced in 2010 failed.
 Grandfather National Scenic Area, North Carolina, 2011
 Black Mountain Scenic Area, California, 2019
 Condor Ridge Scenic Area, California, 2019

Former National Scenic Areas
 East Mojave National Scenic Area, designated Mojave National Preserve in 1994

See also
 Protected areas of the United States

References

External links
 

Protected areas of the United States